Salute to the Teenagers is a 1960 TV documentary hosted by Pat Boone. It was produced by his Cooga Mooga company. It aired on 27 June 1960 and starred Fabian, Bobby Darin and Connie Francis. It was also known as Coke Time.

References

American documentary television films
1960 television films
1960 films
1960s American films